Stevie is a 1977 play by Hugh Whitemore, about the life of poet Stevie Smith. The play received a film adaptation in 1978 directed by Robert Enders, with Glenda Jackson, Mona Washbourne, Alec McCowen and Trevor Howard.

Plot 
British poet/author Stevie Smith lives with her beloved aunt. Her life story is told through direct dialogue with the audience by Stevie, as well as flashbacks, and narration by a friend known as "The Man". The main focus is on her relationship with her aunt, romantic relationships of the past, including her boyfriend Freddie, and the fame she received late in her life. Stevie escapes her dull middle-class existence through her poetry. Though she takes many spiritual flights of fancy, she never truly leaves the suburban house wherein all the action takes place.

References

1977 plays
Plays by Hugh Whitemore